Tri-Eastern Conference all-sports titles won.

Boys'

Girls'

Sources 
T.E.C. Boys Champions
T.E.C. Girls Champions

High school sports conferences and leagues in the United States
Indiana High School Athletic Association